Elisha Archibald Manning III (born May 19, 1949) is an American former professional football player who was a quarterback in the National Football League (NFL) for 13 seasons, primarily with the New Orleans Saints. He played for the Saints from 1971 to 1982 and also had brief stints with the Houston Oilers and Minnesota Vikings. In college, he played for the Ole Miss Rebels football team at the University of Mississippi and was inducted into the College Football Hall of Fame in 1989. Manning is the patriarch of the Manning football dynasty, having preceded sons Peyton and Eli as a successful college and NFL quarterback.

Early life
Born in Drew, Mississippi, Manning was the son of Jane Elizabeth (née Nelson) and Elisha Archibald Manning Jr. He grew up heavily involved in football, basketball, baseball, and track. His father, known as "Buddy", was interested in Archie's sports activities, but the nature of his job left him little if any time for attending games. Instead, Archie III drew his inspiration from a local high school sports star, James Hobson. His mother was "a ubiquitous presence at all of his games, no matter what the sport or level." Manning attended Drew High School. Manning was selected in the Major League Baseball draft four times, first in 1967 by the Braves, twice by the White Sox, and finally by the Royals in 1971. In the summer of 1969, his father, Buddy Manning, committed suicide. Archie, who was home from college for summer vacation, was the first to discover Buddy's body. In the biopic-documentary Book of Manning, Manning said that he considered dropping out and getting a job to support his mother and sister, but his mother persuaded him to return to college and not put his rising football career to waste.

College career
Manning attended the University of Mississippi in Oxford and was the starting quarterback at Ole Miss for three years. In the first national prime time broadcast of a college football game (on ABC, October 4, 1969), Manning threw 436 yards and three touchdowns, also rushing for 104 yards, in a 33–32 loss to Alabama.

During Manning's last two seasons at the University of Mississippi, the Rebels had a record of 15–7. In his college career, he threw 4,753 yards and 31 touchdowns (despite 40 interceptions) and ran for 823 yards. He scored 14 touchdowns in 1969. In both 1969 and 1970, he was named to the All-SEC team and his No. 18 jersey was retired by Ole Miss. In 1969, Manning was Mississippi Sportsman of the Year and recipient of the Nashville Banner Trophy as Most Valuable Player in the Southeastern Conference in addition to winning the Walter Camp Memorial Trophy. He was fourth in the Heisman Trophy voting in 1969 and third in 1970. He was also inducted into Omicron Delta Kappa in 1970 at Mississippi. 

Manning was inducted to the College Football Hall of Fame in 1989. Manning's legacy is honored to this day on the campus of Ole Miss where the speed limit is 18 miles per hour in honor of Manning's jersey number. During his time at Ole Miss, Manning was a member of Sigma Nu fraternity. He was named Southeastern Conference Quarterback of the Quarter Century (1950–75) by several publications.

NFL career
Manning was the second overall pick in the 1971 NFL Draft and played for the New Orleans Saints for ten full seasons. During his tenure in New Orleans, the Saints had nine losing seasons. They only managed to get to .500 once in 1979, which was also the only season they finished higher than third in their division. Nevertheless, he was well respected by NFL peers. For example, while he was sacked 337 times during his Saints career, Sports Illustrated senior writer Paul Zimmerman wrote in 2007 that the number should have been even higher than that. Zimmerman wrote that opposing defensive linemen, "Jack Youngblood in particular", were known to take it easy on the poorly protected Manning and not hit him as hard as they could. For his part, Manning seemed to appreciate Youngblood's kindness, telling the Los Angeles Times on September 23, 1974, "The Rams front four is the best I ever faced ... I've got to say that Youngblood was nice enough to pick me up every time he knocked my ass off." Today, Manning jokes that Youngblood's career would not have been as successful without him. He even stated that Youngblood should have let him be his presenter when he was inducted into the Pro Football Hall of Fame in 2001, saying, "He wouldn’t have gotten in without having me to sack."

In 1972, he led the league in pass attempts and completions and led the National Football Conference in passing yards, though the team's record was only 2–11–1. Archie sat out the entire 1976 season after corrective surgery on his right shoulder, spending the second half of that season in the team's radio booth after Dick Butkus abruptly quit his position as color commentator. In 1978, he was named the NFC Player of the Year by UPI after leading the Saints to a 7–9 record. That same year, Archie was also named All-NFC by both the UPI and The Sporting News.

Manning was selected to the Pro Bowl in 1978 and 1979. He finished his career with the Houston Oilers (1982–1983) and the Minnesota Vikings (1983–1984). He ended his 13-year career having completed 2,011 of 3,642 passes for 23,911 yards, 125 touchdowns, and 173 interceptions. He also rushed for 2,197 yards and 18 touchdowns. His 2,011 completions ranked 17th in NFL history upon his retirement. His record as a starter was 35–101–3 (26.3%), the worst in NFL history among QBs with at least 100 starts. He retired having never played on a team that notched a winning record or made the playoffs. Indeed, he is one of the few players to have played 10 or more years in the NFL without taking part in an official playoff game.

The Saints have not reissued Manning's No. 8 since he left the team midway through the 1982 season.

NFL career statistics

Regular Season

Post-NFL career
Manning continues to make his home in New Orleans, though he also owns a condo in Oxford, Mississippi, to which he relocated following Hurricane Katrina. He has served as an analyst with the Saints' radio and television broadcasts, and has worked as a commentator for CBS Sports' college football broadcasts. Archie has also appeared as a commercial spokesman for products in Southeast Louisiana, where he remains popular with many fans. Working with his three sons, Cooper, Peyton, and Eli, Archie hosts the Manning Passing Academy each summer. This camp brings together young players from grades 8–12 who work with high school coaches and college players. In 2007, Manning was awarded the Silver Buffalo Award by the Boy Scouts of America. The Silver Buffalo is the highest award given for service to Youth on a national basis.

In 2007, Manning was hired as a spokesman for a United Parcel Service contest to promote its "Delivery Intercept" service. He appeared in an advertising campaign for the UPS Delivery Intercept Challenge Video Contest, which saw amateur videos of football interceptions from high school and youth games. Among the prizes were a tailgate party with Manning as well as Manning-autographed footballs.

In October 2013, Manning was selected to be one of the 13 inaugural members of The College Football Playoff Selection Committee. He is one of three appointees who are members of the College Football Hall of Fame.

In 2014, due to health reasons, he stepped down from the College Football Playoff Committee.

Manning owns a football-themed restaurant called Manning's Sports Bar and Grill, located in Harrah's New Orleans.

Family

Archie Manning is married to Olivia Manning. They met while at Ole Miss. The couple has three sons: Cooper, Peyton, and  Eli. Cooper was diagnosed with spinal stenosis prior to his senior year of high school, which ended his football career. Peyton played 18 years in the NFL, winning two Super Bowls and a record 5 NFL MVPs among many other accolades. He was inducted into the Pro Football Hall of Fame in 2021. Eli, who played 16 years in the NFL, won two Super Bowls in 2008 and 2012, earning the MVP award for both games. Cooper's son, Arch, is the top-rated high school quarterback in the class of 2023.

References

External links

1949 births
Living people
American football quarterbacks
College football announcers
College Football Hall of Fame inductees
College Football Playoff Selection Committee members
Houston Oilers players
Archie
Minnesota Vikings players
National Conference Pro Bowl players
National Football League announcers
New Orleans Saints announcers
New Orleans Saints players
Ole Miss Rebels baseball players
Ole Miss Rebels football players
People from Drew, Mississippi
Players of American football from Mississippi
Players of American football from New Orleans
Sportspeople from New Orleans
Sportspeople from Oxford, Mississippi